Technopop, Inc. was an American videogame developer, founded by Randel B. Reiss in 1990. It was the first independent American developer for the Sega Genesis, and responsible for most of the early development tools to that system.

Their best known titles are Zero Tolerance for the Genesis, and The Amazing Spider-Man vs. The Kingpin for the Genesis and the Sega CD.

When the company was dissolved, in 2000, all of its assets were transferred to Reiss, the company's president and single remaining shareholder.

Games 

 The Amazing Spider-Man vs. The Kingpin (Genesis / SegaCD, 1991)
 Zero Tolerance (Genesis, 1994)
 Thumbelina (Windows / Mac, 1995)
 The Emperor's New Clothes  (Windows / Mac, 1995)
 Point of Impact (Windows, 1995)
 Williams Arcade Classics (Windows, 1996)
 Yoot Tower (Windows / Mac, 1998) localization for US release only

Unreleased
 Beyond Zero Tolerance (Genesis)

References

External links 
 Technopop (memorial site)
 Randel Reiss

Defunct video game companies of the United States
Video game companies established in 1990
Video game companies disestablished in 2000
Video game development companies
1990 establishments in California
2000 disestablishments in California